The Wonderland, known in Japan and the UK as , is a 2019 Japanese animated coming-of-age fantasy adventure film directed by Keiichi Hara. Based on the 1988 children's story Chikashitsu Kara no Fushigi na Tabi (Strange Journey from the Basement) by Sachiko Kashiwaba, it stars Mayu Matsuoka, Anne Watanabe and Kumiko Aso. The characters were designed by Ilya Kuvshinov. It premiered in Japan on April 26, 2019, and was screened in competition at the Annecy International Animation Film Festival in June 2019. It was the final Japanese film to be released in the Heisei era, five days before the 2019 Japanese imperial transition.

Voice cast
 Mayu Matsuoka as Akane
 Anne Watanabe as Chii
 Kumiko Aso as Midori
 Nao Tōyama as Pipo
 Keiji Fujiwara as Zan Gu
 Akiko Yajima as Doropo

English voice cast
 Lisa Reimold as Akane
 Allegra Clark as Chii
 TBA as Midori
 Jackie Lastra as Pipo
 Ben Lepley as Zan Gu
 Jennifer Losi as Doropo
 Zach Aguilar as Prince
 Frank Todaro as Hippocrates

Release and reception
Matt Schley of The Japan Times gave the film 3 out of 5 stars, praising the animation and visuals but suggesting it as being among a number of anime films "trying to recreate the charms of Miyazaki". He concluded: "The Wonderland is not the first, and will almost definitely not be the last, to try to push the Miyazaki buttons — and while it succeeds on the surface, it lacks the deeper emotional core to make for something truly wondrous." Allan Hunter of Screen Daily wrote that the "overly busy story provides countless opportunities to create imaginative worlds and strange characters, but it also tends to feel like a string of set pieces rather than something that builds dramatic tension or momentum", feeling that "a less elaborate approach might have achieved more of an emotional impact." While noting the film's shortcomings, Twwk of Beneath the Tangles also wrote, "I could appreciate the direction, which sometimes created an intensity and urgency that made me worry for the characters, and the abounding fantasy which reminded me that I, too, had an imagination once."

US and Canada disc releases were available from Shout Factory in 2020-10-06.

References

External links
Warner Bros. site
Eleven Arts site

2019 films
2019 anime films
Coming-of-age anime and manga
Fantasy anime and manga
Japanese fantasy adventure films
Films directed by Keiichi Hara
Warner Bros. films